Mariska Gárdos (1 May 1885 – 23 January 1973) was a Hungarian feminist, union organizer, journalist and editor. She was a founding member of the Union of Trade Employees ( (KAS)) while still a teenager and helped to found the National Association of Woman Workers in Hungary ( (MME)) in 1904. After the post-World War I socialist and Communist governments were crushed in 1920, Gárdos was forced to flee into exile before returning in 1932. She joined the Communist Party as the Soviets occupied Hungary in 1945 and helped to found the Democratic Alliance of Hungarian Women ( (MNDSz)), but resigned shortly afterwards.

Life
Mariska Gárdos was born on 1 May 1885 in the village of Nagyberény, Hungary and moved with her family to Budapest the following year. She moved to Kolozsvár (now Cluj-Napoca, Romania), about 1905 where she worked as a journalist for a few years before returning to Budapest around 1908 where she was employed part-time in a lawyer's office. She married the socialist journalist Ernő Brestovszky in 1909, but they divorced after the death of their infant daughter, Márta. Gárdos married György Pintér in 1913, and they had a single daughter together. After the collapse of the Hungarian Soviet Republic in 1919, she fled to Vienna, Austria and did not return to Budapest until 1932 where she died on 23 January 1973.

Activities
Gárdos joined the Social Democratic Party of Hungary in 1900 and helped to found the KAS shortly afterwards. She worked to found the MME in 1904 and briefly served as its president. She published her first novel, Justice is life, in 1906.

Notes

References

1885 births
1973 deaths
Hungarian feminists
Hungarian journalists
Hungarian women journalists
Hungarian Jews
Social Democratic Party of Hungary politicians
Hungarian Communist Party politicians
Socialist feminists
People from Somogy County
20th-century journalists